Althoffia is a monotypic genus of tunicates belonging to the family Oikopleuridae. The only species is Althoffia tumida.

The species is found in Atlantic Ocean.

References

Tunicates
Tunicate genera
Monotypic tunicate genera